Wild Well Control is a well control company based in Houston, Texas that has worked to mitigate several high-profile well control issues including the Kuwaiti oil fires and the Deepwater Horizon oil spill.

According to its website it has responded to 2,700 well control and pressure control events including the majority of the large international well control emergencies.

It is a subsidiary of Superior Energy Services.

History
Founded in 1975, Wild Well is the world's leading provider of onshore and offshore well control emergency response, pressure control, relief well planning, engineering, and training services. Wild Well Control was founded by Joe R. Bowden Sr. in 1975 (July 15, 1932 – November 12, 2006).  Its main competition was Red Adair and Company. In 1991 it was one of the companies used to cap the Kuwaiti oil fires. Its involvement was the subject of the documentary Fires of Kuwait.  In 2001 it was acquired by Superior Energy Services.

In 2008 it received a contract for $750 million to decommission seven downed platforms and related well facilities located offshore Louisiana belonging to BP, Chevron, and Apache Corporation.

In 2010 it was designated by BP to come up with a way to cap the Deepwater Horizon oil spill.

References

External links
wildwell.com

Well control companies
Oil companies of the United States
Companies based in Houston
Deepwater Horizon oil spill
Energy companies established in 1975
Non-renewable resource companies established in 1975
1975 establishments in Texas